The Norwegian Fourth Division, also called 4. divisjon, is the fifth highest division of the men's football league in Norway. Like the rest of the Norwegian football league system, the season runs from spring to autumn, running approximately from April to October.

In 2019, it was decided that not all 24 group winners would promote to 3. divisjon. A play-off system was established and the number of teams promoting from 4. divisjon was reduced to 18. Since the 2017 season, 4. divisjon teams have been eligible to qualify for the Norwegian Cup. Ahead of the 2020 season, the number of groups were reduced to 22.

Like in the rest of the Norwegian football league system, all the teams play each other twice, once at home and once away. Three points are awarded for a win, one for a draw, and if two teams are equal on points, the one with the best goal difference is above the other on the table. The teams are placed in the 24 sections according to geographic considerations.

The District Football Associations are responsible for the administration of 4. divisjon. The Norwegian Football Federation is responsible for the administration of 3. divisjon and the higher tiers of the Norwegian football league system.

History

1963–2010
The 4. divisjon was known as the 5. divisjon from 1963 until 1990, when the top-tier league changed its name to Tippeligaen, the 2. divisjon became the 1. divisjon and the names of all the lower divisions were adjusted accordingly.

2012–2016
From 2012 to 2016, 4. divisjon consisted of 26 parallel sections of 10 to 15 teams, and  a total of 34 teams promoted from 4. divisjon.

2017–
After changes in the Norwegian football pyramid, no teams where promoted from the 4. divisjon after the 2016 season. The fifth tier was split into twenty-four groups.

With fewer teams in the above tiers of the football pyramid, 4. divisjon teams routinely participate in the Norwegian Football Cup.

In 2020, the number of groups were reduced to 22.

Reserve teams

Reserve teams of clubs from higher divisions can participate in the 4. divisjon. Reserve teams of clubs from the 3. divisjon can not be promoted from the 4. divisjon.

Winners

2017–
Teams in italics lost promotion play-offs and were not promoted.

Group 1–12

Group 13–24

Group 25–28

Administration
The District Football Associations are responsible for the administration of 4. divisjon. The Norwegian Football Federation is responsible for the administration of 3. divisjon and the higher tiers of the Norwegian football league system.

The current 22 groups are administrated by the following districts:

 Agder Fotballkrets (one section)
 Akershus Fotballkrets (one section)
 Buskerud Fotballkrets (one section)
 Finnmark Fotballkrets (one section)
 Hålogaland Fotballkrets (one section)
 Hordaland Fotballkrets (two sections)

 Indre Østland Fotballkrets (one section)
 Nordland Fotballkrets (one section)
 Nordmøre og Romsdal Fotballkrets (one section)
 Oslo Fotballkrets (two sections)
 Østfold Fotballkrets (one section) 
 Rogaland Fotballkrets (two sections)

 Sogn og Fjordane Fotballkrets (one section)
 Sunnmøre Fotballkrets (one section)
 Telemark Fotballkrets (one section)
 Troms Fotballkrets (one section)
 Trøndelag Fotballkrets (two sections)
 Vestfold Fotballkrets (one section)

Current teams

Agder
Express
Floy B
Froland
Giv Akt
Jerv B
Lyngdal
Sogne
Tigerberget
Torridal
Trauma
Vag
Vigor
Vindbjart B

Akershus
Aurskog Holand
Eidsvold
Eidsvold Turn B
Fjellhamar
Gjellerasen B
Hauerseter
Klofta
Lorenskog B
Lovenstad
Raumnes & Arnes
Raelingen
Strommen B
Sorumsand
Ull Kisa B

Buskerud
Assiden
Drammens
Eiker
Hallingdal
Hokksund
Jevnaker
Kongsberg
Konnerud
Modum
ROS
Sande
Stoppen
Svelvik
Vestfossen

Finnmark
Alta B
Bossekop
Honningsvag
Indrefjord
Kirkenes
Nordlys
Norild
Porsanger
Soroy Glimt
Tverrelvdalen

Hordaland Group 1
Arna
Askoy
NHHI
Nordhordland
Odda
Osteroy
Oystese
Radoy
Sotra B
Sund
Trio
Voss

Hordaland Group 2
Asane B
Austevoll
Djerv Utd
Fana B
Flaktveit
Lyngbo
Nymark
Saedalen
Smoras
Tertnes
Trott
Varegg

Hålogaland
Andenes
Ballangen
Harstad
Landsas
Leknes Ballstad
Lofoten
Medkila
Melbo
Morild
Sortland
Stokmarknes
Svolvaer

Indre Østland
Brumunddal B
Faaberg
Flisa
Furnes
Gjovik B
Gran
Kolbu
Kongsvinger B
Lillehammer
Loten
Nybergsund
Ottestad
Toten
Valdres

Nordland
Bodo Glimt C
Bossmo Ytteren
Fauske Sprint
Grand Bodo
Hulloy Bodo
Innstranda
Junkeren B
Meloy
Mosjoen B
Rana B
Sandnessjoen
StalKam

Nordmøre og Romsdal
Andalsnes
Dahle
Eide
Elnesvagen
Kristiansunds Utd (Clausenengen)
Malmefjorden
Midsund
Sunndal
Surnadal
Tomrefjord
Traeff B
Vestnes

Oslo Group I
Asker B
Baerum B
Gamle
Holmen
Kjelsas B
Lokomotiv Oslo B
Lommedalen
Manglerud
Oldenborg
Oppsal B
Oslojuvelene
Ready

Oslo Group II
Arvoll
Carl Berner
Christiania
Fagerborg
Follo B
Grei
Gruner
Heming
Holmlia
Kolbotn
Lyn B
Stovner

Rogaland Group I
Algard
Brusand
Bryne B
Egersunds B
Forus
Hana
Haugesund B
Hinna
Hundvag
Midtbygden
Randaberg
Riska
Sola
Stavanger

Rogaland Group II
Akra
Djerv B
Froyland
Klepp
Kopervik
Nord
Rosseland
Sandved
Skjold
Torvastad
Vard B
Vardeneset
Varhaug
Vidar B

Sogn og Fjordane
Ardal
Bremanger
Eid
Fjora
Forde B
Hoyang
Jolster
Maloy
Sandane
Stryn
Studentspretten
Vik

Sunnmøre
Aksla
Bergsoy
Blindheim
Hareid
Herd
Hovebygda
Langevag
Norborg (Brattvag B)
Orsta
Rollon
Hessa
Volda B

Telemark
Eidanger
Hei
Kragero
Notodden B
Odd C
Pors B
Skarphedin
Skiens
Stathelle
Storm
Tollnes
Uraedd

Troms
Finnsnes
Hamna
Ishavsbyen
Krokelvdalen
Nordreisa
Ringvassoy
Salangen
Senja
Skarp
Storelva
Tromsdalen B
Ulfstind

Trøndelag Group 1
Charlottenlund
Flatanger
Heimdal
Lange
Levanger B
Namsos
Nidelv
Ranheim B
Rorvik
Stjordals B
Trygg
Vuku

Trøndelag Group 2
Alvdal
Hitra
Hemne
Kvik
Melhus
Nardo B
NTNUI
Orkla B
Orland
Strindheim B
Sverresborg
Tynset

Vestfold
Asgardstrand
Flint
Husoy
Notteroy
Orn B
Re
Runar
Sandefjord Utd
Stag (Fram Larvik B)
Stokke
Teie
Tonsberg B

Østfold
As
Askim
Borgen
Drobak Frogn
Krakeroy
Kvik Halden B
Lisleby
Moss B
Ostsiden
Rade
Sarpsborg Utd
Sparta
Sprint Jeloy B
Tistedalen

References

External links

4.division summary(SOCCERWAY)

 
5
Year of establishment missing
Nor
Professional sports leagues in Norway